In Brazilian football, G-12 (Big Twelve) refers to a group of 12 clubs: Atlético Mineiro, Botafogo, Corinthians, Cruzeiro, Flamengo, Fluminense, Grêmio, Internacional, Palmeiras, Santos, São Paulo and Vasco da Gama. They are considered to be the most popular and successful sides in Brazilian football, having won all but six editions of the Brasileirão between them since the inception of the tournament.

The clubs

Honours and popularity 

Their status as major clubs in Brazilian football stems from their historical performances at their respective state leagues. For a long time, there were no national tournaments in Brazil (with the first edition of the Brasileirão being only held in 1959) and competition between teams from different states was sparse (with the Torneio Rio-São Paulo, held irregularly between 1933 and 1966 and then from 1993 to 2002, being the most notable tournament of this nature); thus, these clubs first earned their distinguished reputation for being dominant within state borders.

This regional success translated into national and international glory. The Big Twelve clubs have dominated the Brasileirão and the Copa do Brasil and put up great performances at the Copa Libertadores and the Club World Cup (and other equivalent world tournaments).

The Big Twelve are also the most supported clubs in Brazil, enjoying nationwide popularity. Even away from state borders, it is not hard to find supporters of Big Twelve clubs., often surpassing even local clubs.

Controversies 

The validity of the concept of a Big Twelve is often topic of debate. It is at times portrayed as a rigid construct that excludes teams that merit a place in this group and at other times it is argued to be an outdated definition that includes clubs whose place is no longer merited.

The case for more teams

Esporte Clube Bahia 

Bahia hails from Salvador, Bahia and is one of the two major clubs from the Campeonato Baiano (the other being Vitória). It is the only non-Big Twelve club to have two Brasileirão titles to its name (tied with Grêmio, Botafogo and Atlético Mineiro), notably beating Pelé and Os Santásticos in the final of the 1959 edition. Numerable speaking, its supporters compete with those of Fluminense and Botafogo and are ahead of any non-Big Twelve ones. It is, in fact, one of the Clube dos 13's founding members alongside the Big Twelve. Prior its first relegation in 1997, Bahia was considered one of the biggest clubs in Brazil. However, its Brasileirão campaigns have been generally unimpressive since the 1980s, and the club spent much of the 2000s outside the first division.

Bahia was relegated in 1997 to the Campeonato Brasileiro Serie B and only come back to the top tier of Brazilian football in 2000 with a political maneuver, after cbf's withdrawal from organizing the championship of that year due to legal problems and handing it to Clube dos 13, because the club failed in achieve the promotion to Serie A in 1998 and 1999. Bahia was again relegated to Serie B in 2003 and relegated to Serie C in 2005, the low-point in the history of the club. The team disputed two seasons of Serie C until achieve its first promotion in history in 2007 to the Serie B, and in 2010 the team was promoted for the first time to the Brasileirão. Bahia was relegated in 2014 Campeonato Brasileiro Série A, but this time they only became two seasons out of Série A and made the comeback in the 2017 edition

The club also lags behind Big Twelve clubs in financial assets.

Paraná State 

From Curitiba one of the main clubs in the city are Coritiba Foot Ball Club and Club Athletico Paranaense and the league this state is the Campeonato Paranaense. Athletico Paranaense is often regarded as one of the best-run clubs in Brazil, with financial results that rival those of the Big Twelve. The club has won the Brasileirão once, in 2001, and its best campaigns at the Copa Libertadores were a runner-up showing in 2005 and 2022. However, the club has a very poor pre-1990s record at the Brasileirão and its fanbase is relatively small compared to Big Twelve clubs and very much contained within Paraná's borders. Coritiba won one title of Brasileirão, conquered in 1985 and it was the first club of Paraná to participate Copa Libertadores, in 1986, 
as well as the first club to carry an expression title in its state. Athletico Paranaense also won the titles of Copa do Brasil, which neither the G12 clubs Botafogo and São Paulo won, and also Copa Sudamericana (or another of its predecessors), which Fluminense did not win.

Other clubs 

Like the Big Twelve and Bahia, Coritiba and Athletico Paranaense, the teams Guarani, Portuguesa, Goiás, Sport and Vitória were also members of the Clube dos 13, that were composed by the most important and traditional on that period. But each one of them had issues after that.

Guarani, the 1978 Campeonato Brasileiro Série A champion  and Sport Club do Recife and the 1987 Campeonato Brasileiro Série A champion, are the other Campeonato Brasileiro Série A champions outside the Big Twelve. They both struggles with financial problems, and Sport has the worst financial situation between all clubs that plays in Campeonato Brasileiro Série A this year.

Goiás and Vitória spent mostly of previous seasons on the second division, but achieved good things on the last years. Goiás was the 2010 Copa Sudamericana runner-up, and Vitoria was the 1993 Campeonato Brasileiro Série A and 2010 Copa do Brasil runner-up.

After the "Héverton Case", that made the team been relegated to the second division, the Portuguesa was relegated more two times straight, and now do not compete any national championship, been on Campeonato Paulista Série A2.

During the early 2000's, São Caetano got noticed in both national and international media after being a finalist of 2002 Copa Libertadores, the most important tournament in South America. They lost to Olimpia of Paraguay on penalties.

After the Red Bull took over the control of the 1991 Campeonato Brasileiro Série A runner-up, Clube Atlético Bragantino, and changed its name to Red Bull Bragantino. The club claims that it will be one of Brazil's best clubs in the future.

The case for fewer teams 

It is often argued if there is too big a gap even between Big Twelve clubs in honours (outside of state leagues) and fanbase size. Flamengo and Corinthians could be argued to be in a tier of their own in terms of supporters, far above third place São Paulo and Palmeiras, but this supposed superiority does not translate into the pitch, with many teams claiming more titles than them in the Brasileirão, Copa do Brasil, Copa Libertadores, and Club World Cup. Similarly, it's sometimes argued if Santos, Fluminense and Botafogo are below their regional rivals (Corinthians, São Paulo and Palmeiras all boast significantly more supporters than Santos; Flamengo and Vasco da Gama lay claim to more international success than Fluminense and Botafogo). However, these three clubs' importance to Brazilian football cannot be understated: Santos's Os Santásticos was the most dominant Brazilian side ever, winning six Brasileirão and eight Campeonato Paulista titles in the 1960s; Botafogo hold the record for most capped players for the Brazil national football team in World Cups; and Fluminense introduced the sport to Rio de Janeiro, being the oldest active club in Rio, with the birth of the Brazil national football team happening on its grounds in a friendly against Exeter City.

See also 

 State football leagues in Brazil
 Big Five (Argentine football)
 Big Four (Mexico)
 Big Three (Netherlands)
 Big Three (Portugal)

References 

Football in Brazil
Santos FC
Cruzeiro Esporte Clube
CR Vasco da Gama
CR Flamengo
Clube Atlético Mineiro
Botafogo de Futebol e Regatas
Sport Club Corinthians Paulista
Fluminense FC
Grêmio Foot-Ball Porto Alegrense
Sport Club Internacional
Sociedade Esportiva Palmeiras
São Paulo FC
Nicknames in sports
Association football terminology